Chundikkulam National Park is a national park in northern Sri Lanka, approximately  north east of Kilinochchi.

History
Chundikkulam Lagoon and its surrounding area was designated as a bird sanctuary on 25 February 1938 under the Fauna and Flora Protection Ordinance (No. 2) of 1937.

In January 2009 the Sri Lanka Army's 55 Division, advancing from Nagar Kovil, re-captured the area around Chundikkulam sanctuary from the militant Liberation Tigers of Tamil Eelam. Subsequently, the Sri Lankan military started building military bases in the sanctuary and barred local fishermen from using the sanctuary and local residents from returning to their homes. The army opened the Chundikulam Nature Park Holiday Resort in the northern part of the sanctuary in January 2012.

Following the end of the Sri Lankan Civil War the government announced plans to convert various sanctuaries in the Northern Province into national parks. An Integrated Strategic Environmental Assessment of Northern Province produced by the government with the assistance of United Nations Development Programme and United Nations Environment Programme and published in October 2014 recommended that Chundikkulam sanctuary be extended westwards towards Elephant Pass and south-eastwards towards Chalai and Pallamatalan and be upgraded to a national park.

In May 2015 the government announced that Chundikkulam, along with Adam's Bridge, Delft and Madhu Road, would be designated national parks.

Flora and fauna
Chundikkulam Lagoon is partly surrounded by mangrove swamps and sea grass beds. The surrounding area includes palmyra palm plantations, scrub forests and a variety of dry zone flora. Numerous varieties of water and wader birds are found in the park including bar-tailed godwit, black-tailed godwit, black-winged stilt, brown-headed gull, common sandpiper, curlew sandpiper, eurasian coot, eurasian curlew, eurasian spoonbill, eurasian teal, eurasian wigeon, garganey, greater flamingo, gull-billed tern, marsh sandpiper, northern pintail, oriental ibis, painted stork, ruff, shoveler, terek sandpiper and wood sandpiper. Mammals found in the park include leopard, sloth bear and deer. Mugger crocodile and saltwater crocodile have also been seen in the park.

References

1938 establishments in Ceylon
Important Bird Areas of Sri Lanka
Karachchi DS Division
Maritimepattu DS Division
National parks of Sri Lanka
Pachchilaipalli DS Division
Protected areas established in 1938
Protected areas in Northern Province, Sri Lanka
Vadamarachchi East DS Division